James Thomas Looney (born May 15, 1995) is an American football tight end who is currently a free agent. He played college football at California.

College career
Looney initially started his collegiate career as a defensive end at Wake Forest in 2013, appearing in six games. He transferred to Cal in 2014 and had to sit out a season per NCAA transfer rules. In 2015, he started in 11 games and appeared in 12 games. He recorded 35 tackles, 3.0 tackles for loss, one sack, one pass breakup, and one fumble recovery. In 2016, he started all 12 games and recorded 54 tackles, one forced fumble, 3.5 sacks, eight tackles for loss (−38 yards), one fumble recovery, and two quarterback hurries. In his final collegiate season in 2017, he started all 12 games and recorded 41 tackles, 9.5 tackles for loss, 3.5 sacks, three quarterback hurries, one forced fumble, and two fumble recoveries.

Professional career
Looney was drafted by the Green Bay Packers in the seventh round (232nd overall) of the 2018 NFL Draft. He signed his rookie contract on May 7, 2018. He was waived on September 1, 2018, and was signed to the practice squad the next day. He was promoted to the active roster on November 24, 2018.

On August 31, 2019, Looney was waived by the Packers and was signed to the practice squad the next day. On December 6, 2019, the Packers switched Looney over to tight end. He signed a reserve/future contract with the Packers on January 21, 2020.

The Packers waived Looney on August 15, 2020.

Personal life
Looney's older brother, Joe, is a former NFL offensive lineman who played at Wake Forest in college. Their father played college football at the University of Louisville.

References

External links

California Golden Bears bio

Living people
1995 births
People from Lake Worth Beach, Florida
Players of American football from Florida
Sportspeople from the Miami metropolitan area
American football defensive linemen
California Golden Bears football players
Green Bay Packers players
American football tight ends